Snow White and the Three Stooges is a 1961 American comedy, fantasy film. It is the second feature film to star the Three Stooges after their 1959 resurgence in popularity. By this time, the trio consisted of Moe Howard, Larry Fine, and "Curly Joe" DeRita. Released by 20th Century Fox, this was the trio's take on the classic fairy tale Snow White and the Seven Dwarfs. The film was retitled Snow White and the Three Clowns in the United Kingdom. This was Walter Lang‘s final directing film before his retirement.

Olympic gold medalist figure skater Carol Heiss starred as Snow White, who must flee her home after The Evil Queen, her evil stepmother, wishes her to be dead. Seeking refuge in the cottage of the seven dwarfs, she accidentally meets the Stooges, who are house sitting for them while they are away.

Plot
Once upon a time, in the kingdom of Fortunia, a noble king and his lovely young queen lack but one blessing to make their joy complete. The queen dies giving birth to a daughter named Snow White, the king mourning his beloved before he later remarries at his people's pleas. His new queen is a beautiful but evil woman who soon becomes jealous of Snow White's beauty.

On her 17th birthday, Snow White's father dies and the wicked queen immediately imprisons her. Eventually, the queen's jealousy of her stepdaughter becomes so great that she orders her killed. Snow White escapes her hired assassin and finds refuge in the empty cottage of the seven dwarfs, soon to be joined by the Three Stooges, who are traveling to the castle with their ward Quatro. But the boy they have raised since childhood (also narrowly escaping an assassination attempt by the queen) is actually Prince Charming, who, though he has lost his memory, is betrothed to Snow White.

Snow White and Quatro fall in love, but the queen has him kidnapped upon suspecting his true identity. The Stooges attempt to rescue him disguised as cooks, only to flee with Snow White when Quatro fell from a staircase in the palace and is presumed dead. Curly Joe stole a wish-granting magic sword owned by the queen's court magician Count Oga during that time, inadvertently wishing his group out of the country. The queen learns of this and has Oga turn her into a witch to track down Snow White and kill her. But the moment she left, revealed to rescued by loyalists, Quatro leads a coupe to take back Fortunia with Oga killed during the event.

Meanwhile, the queen finds Snow White and tricks her into taking a bite from a poisoned apple. The queen encounters the Stooges on the way back to the palace, inadvertently killed by Curly Joe's wish on the sword causes her to crashes her broom into the mountainside. The Stooges then find the poisoned Snow White and realized they exhausted the last of the sword's wishes, placing her on a bed instead of burying her. Quatro, exhausting his resources to find Snow White, comes close to giving up hope when he learns of the Evil Queen's magic mirror. The mirror responds truthfully to the desperate Prince's pleas, and the Prince sets off on his journey. He arrives at the Stooges' cabin just in time to dispel the effects of the poisoned apple. Snow White and Prince Charming are married and live happily ever after.

Primary cast

 Moe Howard as Moe
 Larry Fine as Larry
 Joe DeRita as Curly Joe
 Carol Heiss as Snow White
 Edson Stroll as Quatro/Prince Charming
 Patricia Medina as The Evil Queen/Witch
 Guy Rolfe as Count Oga
 Michael David as Rolf
 Buddy Baer as Hordred
 Edgar Barrier as King Augustus
 Peter Coe as Captain
 Mel Blanc as the voice of Quinto the puppet (uncredited)
 Paul Frees as the narrator and voice of the magic mirror (uncredited)

Production
Frank Tashlin was originally set to direct the film at a budget of $750,000 ($ today). Fox then replaced him with Walter Lang, who had previously directed the Stooges in 1933's Meet the Baron. Lang transformed the film into a lavish epic with a budget of $3.5 million ($ today), making it the most expensive film the Stooges ever starred in.  The film was produced and co-written by future U.S. Information Agency head Charles Z. Wick.

Carol Heiss' uncredited singing voice was dubbed by Norma Zimmer (of Lawrence Welk fame).

Edson Stroll's singing voice was dubbed by Bill Lee.

Patricia Medina later recalled that Carol Heiss repeatedly tried to get her fired from the film.

Reception
Despite the significant investment, Snow White and the Three Stooges did poorly at the box office. The only 1960s Stooge feature filmed in color, it also became the least popular. Critics did not take kindly to the film, citing a lack of on-screen time for the trio, as well as a lack of their signature slapstick comedy. The studio was unable to recover the film's costs because the comedy-fantasy was tailored specifically to children, who paid only fifty cents each for admission. It would have taken an audience of over 15 million minors for Snow White and the Three Stooges to merely break even. Moe Howard himself often referred to the film as "a Technicolor mistake."

The film, however, was nominated for the Writers Guild of America award for Best Musical Screenplay for 1961.

See also
 List of American films of 1961

References

External links

 
 
 
 
 Snow White and the Three Stooges at threestooges.net

1961 films
1961 romantic comedy films
1961 musical comedy films
American fantasy comedy films
American musical comedy films
American musical fantasy films
American romantic comedy films
American romantic fantasy films
American romantic musical films
American war comedy films
1960s English-language films
The Three Stooges films
Figure skating films
Films about royalty
Films based on Snow White
Films directed by Walter Lang
Films with screenplays by Frank Tashlin
20th Century Fox films
CinemaScope films
Films with screenplays by Noel Langley
1960s American films